Bousín is a municipality and village in Prostějov District in the Olomouc Region of the Czech Republic. It has about 100 inhabitants.

Administrative parts
The village of Repechy is an administrative part of Bousín.

History
The first written mention of Bousín is from 1347.

References

Villages in Prostějov District